The Irish League in season 1920–21 comprised 5 teams, and Glentoran won the championship.

League standings

Results

References
Northern Ireland - List of final tables (RSSSF)

NIFL Premiership seasons
North
Irish
Football
Football